San Marcos de Colón is a town, with a population of 12,870 (2020 calculation), and a municipality in the Honduran department of Choluteca, located on the border with Nicaragua.

The town is located on the Pan-American Highway near the Nicaraguan border town of Somoto, and 192 km away from the capital Tegucigalpa.

History
The town received city status in 1927, though its origins date back to 1795.

Climate
The climate has traditionally been described as tropical. However, due to widespread agricultural deforestation and a higher altitude (3500 to 5000 feet above sea level); the climate can be more aptly described in many cases as temperate. It can be dusty in the dry season (January through March).

Sports
The local football team, Atlético Pinares, played in the second tier of Honduran football until it sold its franchise to Comayagua F.C. in 2012.

References

Municipalities of the Choluteca Department